Matías Rodríguez Inciarte (born 23 March 1948) is a Spanish politician from the Union of the Democratic Centre (UCD) who served as Ministry of the Presidency from September 1981 to December 1982.

References

1948 births
Living people
Complutense University of Madrid alumni
Government ministers of Spain
20th-century Spanish politicians